The 2008 Côte d'Ivoire Premier Division season was the 48th of the competition. The season took place between 24 February and 23 November 2008. The league was composed of fourteen teams, playing a double round-robin tournament with weekly games, except for certain dates reserved by FIFA to allow players to represent their country. Africa Sports National were the defending champions, having won their fifteenth league title during the previous season.

During the season, three games were abandoned, two due to crowd troubles, and one due to forfeit. All three games were ruled as two goal wins for the visiting team, and five goal defeats to the receiving team.

On 23 November 2008, Africa Sports National beat RC Dalona on the final matchday of the season, thus meaning that Africa Sports National retained the trophy, winning the Ivory Coast Ligue 1 for the sixteenth time of their history. On the other hand, RC Dalona and SC Gagona were relegated to the Ivory Coast Ligue 2. The competition's top goalscorer was ASEC Mimosas player Gohi Bi Zoro Cyriac who scored 21 goals.

Teams

Table

Top goalscorer
Zoro Cyriac Gohi Bi (ASEC Mimosas) 21 goals

External links
 rsssf

Ligue 1 (Ivory Coast) seasons
1
Ivory
Ivory